Vecsaule is a village in Vecsaule Parish, Bauska Municipality in the Semigallia region of Latvia, located in the western part of the parish, on the bank of the Vecsaules stream on the road P87, 11 km from  Bauska and 76 km from Riga. Village has Parish Administration, Vecsaule Elementary School, Library, Doctor Family Practice, post office and shops.

History 
The village formed around the center of Vecsaule Manor, having grown in the postwar years as the central village of the village councils and kolkhoz "Vecsaule". About 1 km south of the motorway  V1020  is the Vecsaule Lutheran Church. Vecsaule Church Pub and Parish is a cultural heritage site of local importance.

See also 
Battle of Saule

References 

Villages in Latvia
Bauska Municipality
Semigallia